Michela Brunelli (born 5 July 1974 in Bussolengo) is an Italian paralympic athlete who won a silver medal at the 2008 Summer Paralympics. She competed at the 2020 Summer Paralympics, in Women's team – Class 1–3, winning a bronze medal.

Biography
As a result of an accident she is paraplegic from the age of 17. She competed at the 2017 Romanian Para International Open.

Others achievements

See also
Italy at the 2012 Summer Paralympics

References

External links
 

1974 births
Italian female table tennis players
Table tennis players at the 2008 Summer Paralympics
Table tennis players at the 2012 Summer Paralympics
Table tennis players at the 2016 Summer Paralympics
Table tennis players at the 2020 Summer Paralympics
Paralympic table tennis players of Italy
Medalists at the 2008 Summer Paralympics
Medalists at the 2020 Summer Paralympics
Paralympic medalists in table tennis
Paralympic silver medalists for Italy
Paralympic bronze medalists for Italy
Sportspeople from the Province of Verona
People with paraplegia
Living people
21st-century Italian women